Sohnreyia is a genus of flowering plant in the Citrus, or Rue family (Rutaceae), native to South America (within Bolivia, Brazil, Colombia, Peru and Venezuela). They are all "palmoids" or Corner Model Trees (named for E.J.H. Corner, the first to describe this  architectural growth form). As such they most commonly consist of a single, pachycaul trunk topped by a rosette of very large, pinnate leaves, and are usually monocarpous. The genus was first described by Kurt Krause in 1914.
The genus name of Sohnreyia is in honour of Heinrich Sohnrey (1859–1948), a German teacher and writer.

Species
, Plants of the World Online accepted the following species:
Sohnreyia excelsa K.Krause
Sohnreyia giraldoana (Parra-Os.) Appelhans & Kessler
Sohnreyia maigualidensis J.R.Grande & Kallunki
Sohnreyia terminalioides (A.H.Gentry) Appelhans & Kessler
Sohnreyia ulei (Engl. ex Harms) Appelhans & Kessler

References

Cneoroideae
Rutaceae genera
Plants described in 1845
Flora of Bolivia
Flora of Brazil
Flora of Colombia
Flora of Peru
Flora of Venezuela